Illud Divinum Insanus is the eighth studio album by American death metal band Morbid Angel. It was released on June 7, 2011, by independent French record label Season of Mist. It is Morbid Angel's first album since Heretic (2003), the band's longest gap to date between studio albums. This is the only Morbid Angel album to feature guitarist Destructhor and drummer Tim Yeung, making it their first not to feature Pete Sandoval, who was recovering from surgery. It is also the band's only album to feature bassist/vocalist David Vincent since he rejoined in 2004. The album is controversial for its eccentric influences and sound that differs heavily from Morbid Angel's traditional musical style, fan backlash to the record was harsh but most critics were generally mixed.

Recording and production
Illud Divinum Insanus is the band's only album featuring Norwegian guitarist Destructhor, the first with bassist/vocalist David Vincent since Domination (1995), and the first to not include longtime drummer Pete Sandoval, who had undergone back surgery when recording began. Former Hate Eternal drummer Tim Yeung recorded the drum tracks for this album.

Illud Divinum Insanus took more than five years to materialize. Work on the album began in 2006, and it was originally going to be released in 2007, but was pushed back several times while the band continued touring and writing new material. After four years of writing, Morbid Angel began development on the album from June 2010 to January 2011 at several studios, including Mana Recording Studios and Red Room Studios for the drum recording, and D.O.W. Studios for the bass, guitars, and vocals. Illud Divinum Insanus was mixed in Hollywood, California, with Sean Beavan.

Promotion and release

The cover art for the album was unveiled on March 30, 2011. It was designed by Brazilian artist Gustavo Sazes, who commented:

The album's track listing and information of various release formats were unveiled on April 5, 2011. Prior to the release of the album, a single for the song "Nevermore" was made available on May 16 as a digital download and on 7" vinyl. The cover artwork for the single was designed by French artists Valnoir and Fursy Teyssier for Metastazis. The single also contains an exclusive version of the song "Destructos vs. the Earth", remixed by Combichrist.

In 2012, a double remix album called Illud Divinum Insanus – The Remixes was released.

Reception

The album received mixed reviews from critics and generated a strong backlash from fans, many of whom were dissatisfied with the group's attempt to add an industrial element to the album. Louisville Music News labeled the album a "failed experiment" and a "joke", and described Illud Divinum Insanus as Morbid Angel's St. Anger, in reference to the Metallica album. Metal Injection gave the album 3/10 and described the album as "a joke" and an "overall bummer to listen to." They criticised the lack of heavy, interesting guitarwork and Pete Sandoval's absence from the album, writing that "Instead, we’re left with fifty-six plodding minutes of (mostly) forgettable death metal and/or offensively terrible industrial metal." They also highlighted David Vincent's lyrics for particular criticism, describing them as "atrocious" and "pretty awful pretty much the entire time". Blabbermouth criticised the album, particularly for the programmed drums, and argued that even the four best tracks on the album sounded "uninspired and even if the band dumped blood, sweat and tears into these songs, that still wouldn't make up for the fact that a track like "Radikult" takes up space on the same album."

Conversely, Phil Freeman of Allmusic said that while "those who love the band's earliest records...are bound to see Illud Divinum Insanus''' experiments with industrial...as betrayals of everything the group once stood for", "many of the songs on Illud...are as raw and savage as anything the band's ever recorded", and that the album is "a left turn by a band that's already made many of them throughout its...career". Metal Hammer gave 9/10, describing the album as "a twisted, confrontational masterpiece". The album received praise before its release from artists including Mikael Åkerfeldt from Opeth, Anders Nyström from Katatonia and several other metal artists. However, drummer Pete Sandoval disliked the album, saying, "I don't know why they did that with the DJs, they could've have [sic] just done a separate project without calling it a Morbid Angel album. That might have been better." Sandoval was unable to contribute to the recording of Illud Divinum Insanus'' due to injuries, and later left the band entirely.

Guitarist Trey Azagthoth calls the album "a confused effort", whose unfocused direction ultimately led to David Vincent's departure in 2015, and offers no apologies over the computerized beats and effects, with a comment about the song "Radikult", calling it "a silly song", "...I had nothing to do with that thing."

Track listing

Personnel

Morbid Angel
 David Vincent – bass, vocals, keyboards
 Trey Azagthoth – guitars
 Destructhor – guitars

Session musician
 Tim Yeung – drums

Production
 Sean Beavan – engineering, mixing
 Gunter Ford – management
 Juan "Punchy" Gonzalez – engineering
 Mark Prator – engineering
 Erik Rutan – engineering
 Gustavo Sazes – cover art, design

Charts

References

Morbid Angel albums
2011 albums
Season of Mist albums
Industrial metal albums